Shirish Kunder (born 24 May 1973) is an Indian filmmaker. After working as an editor on 21 films starting with Champion (2000), Kunder made his screenwriting and directorial debut with Jaan-E-Mann (2006). He is married to choreographer and film director Farah Khan whom he met while working on her 2004 film Main Hoon Na.

Early life
Kunder was born on 24 May 1973 in Mangalore, Karnataka and brought up in Mumbai, Maharashtra. He studied Electronics & Telecommunications Engineering at the SDM College of Engineering and Technology in Dharwad.

Career
Kunder worked as an electronics engineer in Motorola for four years before changing profession  and in 2004 he married Farah Khan, while working as an editor on one of her films—who was eight years older than him.
Kunder then turned to direction in his debut film, Jaan-E-Mann. Apart from editing and composing the film score, he also wrote the film. The film starred Salman Khan, Akshay Kumar and Preity Zinta, and was released on 20 October 2006. The film was critically acclaimed for its innovative visual narrative style. .

He was a co-producer of Tees Maar Khan, along with Twinkle Khanna and Ronnie Screwvala which he also co-wrote with his brother Ashmith Kunder. Kunder edited the film and composed its title track. The film starred Akshay Kumar, Katrina Kaif and Akshaye Khanna, and was released on 24 December 2010. .

Kunder's second directorial venture was Joker, which he wrote, produced, directed, edited and composed the film score. The film starred Akshay Kumar, Sonakshi Sinha and Shreyas Talpade, and was released on 31 August 2012.

Kunder's third directorial venture was an 18-minute short film titled Kriti, a psychological thriller, featuring Manoj Bajpayee, Radhika Apte and Neha Sharma. It was released to YouTube on 22 June 2016.

Kunder is on social media and has 1.5 million Twitter followers.

Kunder also wrote the humour column "Shirishly Speaking" for the Indian national daily newspaper DNA between 2016 and 2017.

Kunder's fourth directorial venture is a Netflix Original Film titled Mrs Serial Killer, a crime thriller, featuring Jacqueline Fernandez, Manoj Bajpayee and Mohit Raina in the main lead roles, while Aamir Khan's niece Zayn Marie Khan makes her acting debut in the film. It released on 1 May all over the world and is one of the most watched Netflix Original Films from India. Manoj Bajpayee also bagged the best actor in a supporting role award for his brilliant portrayal of Dr Mrityunjoy Mukerjee at the ET Brand Equity SPOTT Awards. Kunder wrote, produced, edited, and composed the original music score for the film.

Personal life

On 9 December 2004, Kunder married director and choreographer Farah Khan. She gave birth to their triplets (following an in vitro procedure) son Czar and daughters Diva and Anya, on 11 February 2008 at Mumbai's Jaslok hospital.

Filmography

Background music score
 Jaan-E-Mann (2006)
 Tees Maar Khan (2010)
 Joker (2012)
 Kriti (2016)
 Mrs Serial Killer (2020)

Music director
 Tees Maar Khan (2010)

Lyrics
 Tees Maar Khan (2010)
 Joker (2013)

Editor
 Champion (2000)
 Yeh Raaste Hain Pyaar Ke (2001)
 Aankhen (2002)
 Koi Mere Dil Se Poochhe (2002)
 Na Tum Jaano Na Hum (2002)
 Armaan (2003)
 Calcutta Mail (2003)
 Chura Liyaa Hai Tumne (2003)
 Matrubhoomi (2003)
 Sandhya (2003)
 Main Hoon Na (2004)
 Uuf Kya Jaadoo Mohabbat Hai (2004)
 Paisa Vasool (2004)
 Socha Na Tha (2005)
 Waqt: The Race Against Time (2005)
 Benaam (2006)
 Jaan-E-Mann (2006)
 Om Shanti Om (2007)
 Tees Maar Khan (2010)
 Joker (2012)
 Kriti (2016)
 Mrs Serial Killer (2020)

Sound editor
 Split Wide Open (1999)

Promos designer
 Main Hoon Na (2004)

References

External links 
 
 

1973 births
Living people
21st-century Indian dramatists and playwrights
21st-century Indian film directors
21st-century Indian male writers
Artists from Mangalore
Film directors from Karnataka
Film editors from Karnataka
Film producers from Karnataka
Indian male screenwriters
21st-century Indian screenwriters